The Frank R. Lautenberg Chemical Safety for the 21st Century Act is a law passed by the 114th United States Congress and signed into law by US President Barack Obama in 2016. Administered by the United States Environmental Protection Agency, which regulates the introduction of new or already existing chemicals, the Act amends and updates the Toxic Substances Control Act (TSCA) that went into force in 1976.

History 
Senators David Vitter and Frank Lautenberg introduced a TSCA reform bill as S. 1009 on May 22, 2013, co-sponsored by a number of other senators at the United States House Energy Subcommittee on Environment and Economy. After Senator Lautenberg died, Senator Tom Udall sponsored Senate bill 697 in 2015, to amend and re-authorize TSCA, called the Frank R. Lautenberg Chemical Safety for the 21st Century Act. The House then passed H.R.2576, the TSCA Modernization Act of 2015, and was referred to the Senate.

Congress passed a reconciled version of the reform bill with bipartisan support in June 2016. On Wednesday, June 22, 2016, President Barack Obama signed the bill into law. Lawmakers and industry groups were largely supportive of the new law, while environmental advocates offered more mixed reactions.

Changes to TSCA

References

External links 
 Frank R. Lautenberg Chemical Safety for the 21st Century Act as enacted (PDF) in the US Statutes at Large

Acts of the 114th United States Congress
United States federal environmental legislation
2016 in the environment